Steve Mitchell (born July 2, 1964) is a retired American basketball player for the University of Alabama at Birmingham. He was selected with the 12th pick in the second round of the 1986 NBA draft by the Washington Bullets.

References

External links
Italian league profile

1964 births
Living people
American expatriate basketball people in France
American expatriate basketball people in Germany
American expatriate basketball people in Italy
American men's basketball players
Basketball players from Memphis, Tennessee
Point guards
UAB Blazers men's basketball players
Universiade medalists in basketball
Universiade silver medalists for the United States
Washington Bullets draft picks
Wichita Falls Texans players